Newport Township is a township in Johnson County, Iowa, USA.

History
Newport Township was organized in 1846.

References

Townships in Johnson County, Iowa
Townships in Iowa
1846 establishments in Iowa Territory